Latvia is represented by 22 athletes at the 2012 European Athletics Championships held in Helsinki, Finland.

Participants

Broadcasting
LTV

References 

 Zināms Latvijas sastāvs Eiropas čempionātam vieglatlētikā

Nations at the 2012 European Athletics Championships
2012
European Athletics Championships